Research in Number Theory is a peer-reviewed mathematics journal covering number theory and arithmetic geometry. The editors-in-chief are Jennifer Balakrishnan (Boston University), Florian Luca (University of Witwatersrand), Ken Ono (University of Virginia), and Andrew Sutherland (Massachusetts Institute of Technology). It was established in 2015 as a full open access journal, but is now a hybrid open access journal, published by Springer Science+Business Media.

Abstracting and indexing
The journal is abstracted and indexed in EBSCO databases, Emerging Sources Citation Index, MathSciNet, Scopus, and Zentralblatt MATH.

References

External links

English-language journals

Hybrid open access journals
Mathematics journals
Quarterly journals
Springer Science+Business Media academic journals